Abitibi may refer to:

Election districts in Canada 

 Abitibi—Témiscamingue
 Abitibi—Baie-James—Nunavik—Eeyou
 Abitibi (provincial electoral district)

Places in Canada 

 Abitibi Canyon, Ontario, community on the Abitibi River
 Abitibi Canyon Generating Station, hydroelectric power plant
 Abitibi County, Quebec, historical county in southwestern Quebec
 Abitibi gold belt, a gold mining region spanning the border of Ontario and Quebec
 Abitibi Regional County Municipality, Quebec
 Abitibi River
 Abitibi-Ontario Band of Abitibi Indians, or Abitibi, former name of Wahgoshig First Nation
 Abitibi-Témiscamingue, administrative region in Quebec
 Lake Abitibi

Other uses 
 AbitibiBowater, former name of Resolute Forest Products, a pulp and paper manufacturing company
 Abitibi-Consolidated, the company that merged with Bowater to create AbitibiBowater

 Abitibi (train), former name of the Montreal–Senneterre train in Canada

 Abitibi Eskimos, former name of the Timmins Rock, an ice hockey team in Canada